Halkbank  a.d. (full legal name: Halkbank a.d. Beograd), previously known as Čačanska banka, is a Serbian bank founded in 1990 with the headquarters in Belgrade, Serbia. It enters into the composition of BELEXline, one of the main indices of Belgrade Stock Exchange.

History

Although founded back in 1956 under the name Komunalna banka za srez Čačak, in this form Čačanska banka operated since 28 December 1990. It was admitted to the free market in Belgrade Stock Exchange on 15 November 2004.

On 20 March 2015 the Turkish Halkbank acquired 76.76 percent of shares of the Čačanska banka for 10.1 million euros, becoming the sole majority owner. Prior to the acquisition by the Turkish Halk Bankası, it had a network in 24 cities all over Serbia. In 2015, the bank changed its name to Halkbank a.d., and also moved its headquarters from Čačak to Belgrade, due to the expansion of business.

As of February 2017, its ownership structure consisted of: Halkbank (76.76%) and other minor parties.

91.81% of the capital of Čačanska banka Čačak is held by legal entities, of which 28.49% by the Serbian State, 25.00%  by the European Bank for Reconstruction and Development and 20.00% by the International Finance Corporation.

See also
 List of banks in Serbia
 List of companies of Serbia
 National Bank of Serbia
 Belgrade Stock Exchange
 Economy of Serbia

References

External links
 

\
Banks established in 1990
Banks of Serbia
Companies based in Belgrade
Serbian companies established in 1990